This is a shortened version of the first chapter of the ICD-9: Infectious and Parasitic Diseases. It covers ICD codes 001 to 139. The full chapter can be found on pages 49 to 99 of Volume 1, which contains all (sub)categories of the ICD-9. Volume 2 is an alphabetical index of Volume 1. Both volumes can be downloaded for free from the website of the World Health Organization.

Intestinal infectious diseases (001–009)
  Cholera disease
  Typhoid and paratyphoid fevers
  Typhoid fever
  Paratyphoid fever A
  Paratyphoid fever B
  Paratyphoid fever C
  Paratyphoid fever unspecified
  Other Salmonella infections
  Salmonella gastroenteritis
  Shigellosis
  Shigellosis, unspec.
  Other poisoning (bacterial)
  Staphylococcal food poisoning
  Amoebiasis
  Acute amoebic dysentery without mention of abscess
  Chronic intestinal amoebiasis without mention of abscess
  Amoebic nondysenteric colitis
  Amoebic liver abscess
  Amoebic lung abscess
  Amoebic brain abscess
  Amoebic skin ulceration
  Amoebic infection of other sites
  Amoebiasis, unspecified
  Other protozoal intestinal diseases
  Balantidiasis
  Giardiasis
  Coccidiosis
  Intestinal trichomoniasis
  Cryptosporidiosis
  Cyclosporiasis
  Unspecified protozoal intestinal disease
  Intestinal infections due to other organisms
  Enteritis due to Rotavirus
  Enteritis due to other viral enteritis
  Intestinal infection due to other organism not elsewhere classified
  Ill-defined intestinal infections
  Colitis enteritis and Gastroenteritis of presumed infectious origin

Tuberculosis (010–018)
  Primary tuberculous infection
  Primary tuberculous infection
  Tuberculous pleurisy in primary progressive tuberculosis
  Other primary progressive tuberculosis
  Primary Tuberculous infection, Unspecifed
  Pulmonary tuberculosis
  Tuberculosis of lung, Infiltrative
  Tuberculosis of lung, Nodular
  Tuberculosis of lung, with Cavitation
  Tuberculosis of bronchus
  Tuberculous fibrosis of lung
  Tuberculous bronchiectasis
  Tuberculous pneumonia
 any form
  Tuberculous pneumothorax
  Other specified pulmonary tuberculosis
  Pulmonary tuberculosis, Unspecified
 Respiratory tuberculosis
 Tuberculosis of lung
  Other respiratory tuberculosis
  Tuberculosis of meninges and central nervous system
  Tuberculosis of intestines, peritoneum, and mesenteric glands
  Tuberculosis of bones and joints
  Tuberculosis of Vertebral column
 Pott's disease
  Tuberculosis of genitourinary system
  Tuberculosis of other organs
  Erythema nodosum with hypersensitivity reaction in tuberculosis
 Bazin disease
  Tuberculosis of peripheral lymph nodes
 Scrofula
  Miliary tuberculosis

Zoonotic bacterial diseases (020–027)
  Plague
  Bubonic plague
  Tularemia
  Anthrax
  Brucellosis
  Glanders
  Melioidosis
  Rat-bite fever
  Other zoonotic bacterial diseases
  Listeriosis
  Erysipelothrix infection
  Pasteurellosis

Other bacterial diseases (030–041)
  Leprosy
  Diseases due to other mycobacteria
  Diphtheria
  Whooping cough
  Streptococcal sore throat and scarlatina
  Strep throat
  Scarlet fever
  Erysipelas
  Meningococcal meningitis
  Tetanus
  Septicaemia
  Pneumococcal septicemia
  Septicemia, gram-negative, unspec.
  Septicemia, NOS
  Actinomycotic infections
  Other bacterial diseases
  Bacterial infection in conditions classified elsewhere

Human immunodeficiency virus (HIV) infection (042–044)
  Human immunodeficiency virus infection with specified conditions
  Human immunodeficiency virus infection causing other specified
  Other human immunodeficiency virus infection

Poliomyelitis and other non-arthropod-borne viral diseases of central nervous system (045–049)
  Acute poliomyelitis
  Slow virus infection of central nervous system
  kuru
  Creutzfeldt–Jakob disease
  Meningitis due to enterovirus
  Other enterovirus diseases of central nervous system
  Other non-arthropod-borne viral diseases of central nervous system

Viral diseases accompanied by exanthem (050–059)
  Smallpox
  Variola major
  Alastrim
  Modified smallpox
  Smallpox, unspecified
  Cowpox and paravaccinia
  Cowpox and vaccinia not from vaccination
  Cowpox
  Vaccinia not from vaccination
  Pseudocowpox
  Contagious pustular dermatitis
  Paravaccinia, unspecified
  Chickenpox
  Postvaricella encephalitis
  Varicella (hemorrhagic) pneumonitis
  Postvaricella myelitis
  Chickenpox with other specified complications
  Chickenpox with unspecified complication
  Varicella without complication
  Herpes zoster
  Herpes zoster with meningitis
  Herpes zoster with other nervous system complications
  Herpes zoster with unspecified nervous system complication
  Geniculate herpes zoster
  Postherpetic trigeminal neuralgia
  Postherpetic polyneuropathy
  Herpes zoster myelitis
  Herpes zoster with other nervous system complications
  Herpes zoster with ophthalmic complications
  Herpes zoster dermatitis of eyelid
  Herpes zoster keratoconjunctivitis
  Herpes zoster iridocyclitis
  Herpes zoster with other ophthalmic complications
  Herpes zoster with other specified complications
  Otitis externa due to herpes zoster
  Herpes zoster with other specified complications
  Herpes zoster with unspecified complication
  Herpes zoster without mention of complication
  Herpes simplex
  Eczema herpeticum
  Genital herpes
  Genital herpes, unspecified
  Herpetic vulvovaginitis
  Herpetic ulceration of vulva
  Herpetic infection of penis
  Other genital herpes
  Herpetic gingivostomatitis
  Herpetic meningoencephalitis
  Herpes simplex with ophthalmic complications
  Herpes simplex with unspecified ophthalmic complication
  Herpes simplex dermatitis of eyelid
  Dendritic keratitis
  Herpes simplex disciform keratitis
  Herpes simplex iridocyclitis
  Herpes simplex with other ophthalmic complications
  Herpetic septicemia
  Herpetic whitlow
  Herpes simplex with other specified complications
  Visceral herpes simplex
  Herpes simplex meningitis
  Herpes simplex otitis externa
  Herpes simplex myelitis
  Herpes simplex with other specified complications
  Herpes simplex with unspecified complication
  Herpes simplex without mention of complication
  Measles
  Postmeasles encephalitis
  Postmeasles pneumonia
  Postmeasles otitis media
  Measles with other specified complications
  Measles keratoconjunctivitis
  Measles with other specified complications
  Measles with unspecified complication
  Measles without mention of complication
  Rubella
  Rubella with neurological complications
  Rubella with unspecified neurological complication
  Encephalomyelitis due to rubella
  Rubella with other neurological complications
  Rubella with other specified complications
  Arthritis due to rubella
  Rubella with other specified complications
  Rubella with unspecified complications
  Rubella without mention of complication
  Other viral exanthemata
  Erythema infectiosum (fifth disease)
  Other specified viral exanthemata
  Viral exanthem, unspecified
  Other human herpesvirus
  Roseola infantum
  Roseola infantum, unspecified
  Roseola infantum due to human herpesvirus 6
  Roseola infantum due to human herpesvirus 7
  Other human herpesvirus encephalitis
  Human herpesvirus 6 encephalitis
  Other human herpesvirus encephalitis
  Other human herpesvirus infections
  Human herpesvirus 6 infection
  Human herpesvirus 7 infection
  Other human herpesvirus infection
  Other poxvirus infections
  Other orthopoxvirus infections
  Orthopoxvirus infection, unspecified
  Monkeypox
  Other orthopoxvirus infections
  Other parapoxvirus infections
  Parapoxvirus infection, unspecified
  Bovine stomatitis
  Sealpox
  Other parapoxvirus infections
  Yatapoxvirus infections
  Yatapoxvirus infection, unspecified
  Tanapox
  Yaba monkey tumor virus
  Other poxvirus infections
  Poxvirus infections, unspecified

Arthropod-borne viral diseases (060–066)
  Yellow fever
  Dengue fever
  Mosquito-borne viral encephalitis
  Encephalitis, mosquito, unspec.
  Tick-borne viral encephalitis
  Viral encephalitis transmitted by other and unspecified arthropods
  Arthropod-borne hemorrhagic fever
  Ebola, unspec.
  Other arthropod-borne viral diseases
  West Nile virus, unspec.

Other diseases due to viruses and Chlamydiota (070–079)
  Viral hepatitis
  Hepatitis A with hepatic coma
  Hepatitis A w/o coma
  Hepatitis B with hepatic coma
  Hepatitis B w/o coma, acute
  Other specified viral hepatitis with mention of hepatic coma
  Other specified viral hepatitis without mention of hepatic coma
  Unspecified viral Hepatitis C
  Unspecified viral Hepatitis C w/o hepatic coma
  Unspecified viral Hepatitis C with hepatic coma
  Hepatitis, viral, NOS
  Rabies
  Mumps
  Mumps, uncomplicated
  Ornithosis
  Specific diseases due to Coxsackie virus
  Herpangina
  Hand, foot, mouth disease
  Mononucleosis
  Trachoma
  Other diseases of conjunctiva due to viruses and Chlamydiota (formerly Chlamydiae)
  Other diseases due to viruses and Chlamydiota (formerly Chlamydiae)
  Molluscum contagiosum
  Warts, all sites
  Condyloma acuminata
  Sweating fever
  Cat-scratch disease
  Foot-and-mouth disease
  CMV disease
  Viral infection in conditions classified elsewhere and of unspecified site
  Rhinovirus
  HPV
  Respiratory syncytial virus

Rickettsioses and other arthropod-borne diseases (080–088)
  Louse-borne (epidemic) typhus
  Other typhus
  Murine typhus (endemic typhus)
  Brill's disease
  Scrub typhus
  Typhus unspecified
  Tick-borne rickettsioses
  Spotted fevers
  Boutonneuse fever
  North asian tick fever
  Queensland tick typhus
  Ehrlichiosis
  Unspecified ehrlichiosis
  Ehrlichiosis chafeensis
  Other ehrlichiosis
  Other specified tick-borne rickettsioses
  Tick-borne rickettsiosis unspecified
  Other rickettsioses
  Q fever
  Trench fever
  Rickettsialpox
  Other specified rickettsioses
  Rickettsiosis unspecified
  Malaria
  Leishmaniasis
  Trypanosomiasis
  Relapsing fever
  Other arthropod-borne diseases
  Other specified arthropod-borne diseases
  Lyme disease
  Babesiosis

Syphilis and other venereal diseases (090–099)
  Congenital syphilis
  Early syphilis, symptomatic
  Syphilis, primary, genital
  Early syphilis, latent
  Cardiovascular syphilis
  Neurosyphilis
  Other forms of late syphilis, with symptoms
  Late syphilis, latent
  Other and unspecified syphilis
  Gonococcal infections
  Gonorrhoea, acute, lower GU tract
  Conjunctivitis, gonococcal
  Gonococcal infection of other specified sites
  Gonococcal peritonitis
  Other venereal diseases
  Chancroid
  Lymphogranuloma venereum
  Granuloma inguinale
  Reiter's disease
  Other nongonococcal urethritis
  Other venereal diseases due to chlamydia trachomatis
  Other specified venereal diseases
  Venereal disease unspecified

Other spirochetal diseases (100–104)
  Leptospirosis
  Vincent's angina
  Yaws
  Pinta
  Other spirochaetal infection

Mycoses (110–118)
  Dermatophytosis
  Dermatophytosis of scalp/beard
  Onychomycosis
  Dermatophytosis of hand
  Tinea cruris
  Tinea pedis
  Tinea corporis, NOS
  Dermatomycosis, other and unspecified
  Tinea versicolor
  Dermatomycosis, unspec.
  Candidiasis
  Moniliasis, oral
  Moniliasis, vulva/vagina
  Monilial balanitis
  Moniliasis, skin/nails
  Coccidioidomycosis
  Histoplasmosis
  Histoplasma infection, unspec.
  Blastomycotic infection
  Other mycoses
  Opportunistic mycoses

Helminthiases (120–129)
  Schistosomiasis (bilharziasis)
  Other trematode infections
  Echinococcosis
  Other cestode infection
  Trichinosis
  Filarial infection and dracontiasis
  Ancylostomiasis and necatoriasis
  Other intestinal helminthiases
  Ascariasis
  Anisakiasis
  Strongyloidiasis
  Trichuriasis
  Enterobiasis
  Capillariasis
  Trichostrongyliasis
  Other and unspecified helminthiases
  Intestinal parasitism, unspecified

Other infectious and parasitic diseases (130–136)
  Toxoplasmosis
  Toxoplasmosis, unspec.
  Trichomoniasis
  Urogenital trichomoniasis
  Trichomonal vaginitis
  Trichomoniasis, urethritis
  Pediculosis and phthirus infestation
  Pediculosis, head lice
  Pediculosis, body lice
  Pediculosis, pubic lice
  Pediculosis, unspec.
  Acariasis
  Scabies
  Other acariasis
 Chiggers
  Acariasis unspecified
  Other infestation
  Myiasis
  Other arthropod infestation
  Hirudiniasis
  Other specified infestations
  Infestation unspecified
  Sarcoidosis
  Other and unspecified infectious and parasitic diseases
  Ainhum
  Behcet's syndrome
  Pneumocystosis
  Psorospermiasis
  Sarcosporidiosis
  Infectious/parasitic diseases, unspec.

Late effects of infectious and parasitic diseases (137–139)
  Tuberculosis, respiratory, late effects
  Polio, late effects
  Late effects of other infectious and parasitic diseases

International Classification of Diseases